Gordon Wild (born 16 October 1995) is a German professional footballer for 1. FC Bocholt.

College career
Wild played one year of college soccer at University of South Carolina Upstate in 2015, before moving to the University of Maryland, where he played for two years.

Professional career
Ahead of the 2018 MLS SuperDraft, Wild signed a Generation Adidas contract with MLS. On 17 January 2018, Wild was selected 37th overall in the SuperDraft by Atlanta United.

In February 2018, Wild was loaned to United Soccer League side Charleston Battery. He made his professional debut on 17 March 2018 as an 80th-minute substitute in a 1–0 loss to FC Cincinnati.

On 17 July 2019, Wild was waived by Atlanta. Wild was signed a week later by D.C. United. He made his first non-official appearance for D.C. United in a friendly against Olympique de Marseille on 24 July 2019.

Since Wild has signed with DC United he has appeared numerous times for D.C. United's USL affiliate Loudoun United. Wild debuted for Loudoun on 28 July 2019, in a 3–0 win against Louisville City FC. He scored three goals against the Swope Park Rangers on 25 September 2019, earning him a hat trick; the first hat trick in Loudoun United's history.

On 19 January 2020, Wild announced his departure from D.C. United via Instagram.

On 25 February 2020, Wild joined LA Galaxy. Wild made his first MLS appearance off the bench against the Portland Timbers in the MLS is Back tournament, registering an assist for a Javier Hernandez goal. He was released by LA Galaxy on 30 November 2020.

On 11 February 2021, Wild signed with USL Championship side Indy Eleven. Following the 2021 season, it was announced that Wild's contract option was declined by Indy Eleven.

He signed with MSV Duisburg in the summer of 2022. On 29 January 2023, Wild's contract with Duisburg was terminated by mutual consent. Two days later, he moved to 1. FC Bocholt.

Career statistics

References

External links

1995 births
Living people
All-American men's college soccer players
Association football forwards
Atlanta United FC draft picks
Atlanta United FC players
Charleston Battery players
D.C. United players
Expatriate soccer players in the United States
Footballers from Baden-Württemberg
German expatriate footballers
German expatriate sportspeople in the United States
German footballers
LA Galaxy players
Loudoun United FC players
MSV Duisburg players
Maryland Terrapins men's soccer players
People from Leonberg
Sportspeople from Stuttgart (region)
USC Upstate Spartans men's soccer players
USL Championship players
Atlanta United 2 players
Major League Soccer players
Indy Eleven players
1. FC Bocholt players
3. Liga players